The Trade Union and Labour Relations Act 1974 ("TULRA") was a UK Act of Parliament (now repealed) on industrial relations.

The Act contains rules on  the functioning and legal status of trades union, the presumption that a collective agreement is not binding, and immunity of unions who take strike action in contemplation or furtherance of a trade dispute. Together with the Employment Protection Act 1975, TULRA formed the basis of the Labour Party's employment law programme under the "Social Contract" initiative.

Background
The Trade Union and Labour Relations Act 1974 was introduced by the Labour Government which succeeded Edward Heath's Conservative administration. TULRA both repealed and replaced the Industrial Relations Act 1971 which had been introduced by Heath's employment minister Robert Carr. The 1971 Act had faced massive opposition from the trade unions, whose industrial action contributed to Heath's implementation of the three day week and ultimately to the defeat of the government.

The victorious Labour Party promptly repealed the Industrial Relations Act 1971, replacing it with their own legislation that was to incorporate the principles within Barbara Castle's 1969 white paper, "In Place of Strife". However, although the Trade Union and Labour Relations Act 1974 scrapped the 1971 Act's "offensive" provisions, it nevertheless effectively re-enacted the remaining bulk of Carr's statute.

The Trade Union and Labour Relations Act 1974  was itself repealed, being replaced by the Trade Union and Labour Relations (Consolidation) Act 1992, whose main provisions mirror its predecessor's, albeit now with more complexities and restrictions. It contains rules on trade unions functioning and legal status, the presumption that a collective agreement is not binding, and immunity of unions who take strike action in contemplation or furtherance of a trade dispute.

References 

United Kingdom Acts of Parliament 1974
United Kingdom labour law
Labour relations in the United Kingdom
Trade union legislation
British trade unions history
1974 in labor relations